The Best Polish Songs... Ever! is a compilation released by EMI in late 2007. Generally, it has been released for Poles who live abroad and for Polish music fans.

Track listing

CD 2
Krzysztof Kiljański feat. Kayah- "Prócz Ciebie nic" 
Ryszard Rynkowski- "Dziewczyny lubią brąz" 
Blue Café- "Do nieba, do piekła" 
Kasia Cerekwicka- "Na kolana" 
Ewelina Flinta- "Żałuję" 
Feel- "A gdy jest już ciemno" 
Chylińska- "Winna" 
Patrycja Markowska- "Świat się pomylił" 
Marcin Rozynek- "Siłacz" 
Beata- "Siedzę i myślę" 
Goya- "Tylko mnie kochaj" 
Sidney Polak feat. Pezet- "Otwieram wino" 
Reni Jusis- "Kiedyś Cię znajdę" 
Kayah- "Supermanka" 
Anita Lipnicka- "I wszystko się może zdarzyć" 
Justyna Steczkowska- "Dziewczyna szamana" 
Edyta Górniak- "Jestem kobietą" 
Varius Manx- "Zanim zrozumiesz" 
Natalia Kukulska- "Im więcej Ciebie tym mniej" 
Olga Szymańska, Przemysław Branny- "Niech mówią, że to nie jest miłość"

CD 3
Raz Dwa Trzy- "Nikt nikogo (i tak warto żyć)" 
Republika- "Zapytaj mnie czy cię kocham" 
Grzegorz Turnau- "Między ciszą a ciszą" 
Strachy na Lachy- "Dzień Dobry Kocham Cię" 
Szwagierkolaska- "U cioci na imieninach" 
Kult- "Gdy nie ma dzieci"
Elektryczne Gitary- "Włosy" 
Stanisław Soyka- "Tolerancja (Na miły Bóg)" 
Coma- "Spadam" 
Róże Europy- "Jedwab" 
T.Love- "King" 
Klaus Mitffoch - "Jezu, jak się cieszę"
Perfect- "Autobiografia" 
Aya RL- "Skóra" 
Tilt- "Mówię Ci, że" 
Breakout- "Kiedy byłem małym chłopcem" 
Daab- "W moim ogrodzie" 
Sztywny Pal Azji- "Łoże w kolorze czerwonym" 
Kobranocka- "Kocham Cię jak Irlandię" 
Kazik- "Maciek, ja tylko żartowałem"

CD 4
Anita Lipnicka & John Porter- "Bones Of Love" 
Myslovitz- "Sound Of Solitude" 
Wilki- "Son Of The Blue Sky" 
T.Love- "He Was Born To Be Taxi Driver" 
Maanam- "Lipstick On The Glass' 
The Car Is On Fire- "Cranks" 
Stanisław Soyka- "You Are So Beautiful" 
Edyta Górniak- "When You Come Back To Me"
Tatiana Okupnik- "Don't Hold Back" 
Natalia Kukulska- "Sexi Flexi" 
Reni Jusis- "It's Not Enough" 
Edyta Bartosiewicz- "Good Bye To The Roman Candles" 
Makowiecki Band- "Can't Get You Out Of My Head" 
Blue Café- "You May Be In Love" 
Goya- "Smells Like Teen Spirit" 
Pati Yang- "All This Is Thirst" 
Agressiva 69- "Situations"

External links
Album description

Polish
2007 compilation albums
Compilation albums by Polish artists